Mulatto is a term in Haiti that is historically linked to Haitians who are born to one white parent and one black parent, or to two mulatto parents. Contemporary usage of the term in Haiti is also applied to the bourgeoisie, pertaining to high social and economic stature.

People of mulatto and white descent constitute a minority of 5 percent of the Haitian population.

History

Historically, Haitian mulattos have been looked negatively upon, and used by both black and minority white elite when best suited. Blacks regarded them as no better or worse than their unmixed French progenitors. Indeed, many mulattos did align themselves and identify with the ruling French and their culture. Not only were they regarded as a class of their own, but they were also free, highly educated, and wealthy. Being part of their time, many Saint Dominican mulattos were also slaveholders and often actively participated in the oppression of the black majority.

Nevertheless, many mulattos were consequently slaughtered by furious black Haitians during the Haitian Revolution in order to secure black political power over the island. Some black volunteers had even aligned themselves with the French against the mulattos during the Ogé Rebellion.

In Saint-Domingue, mulattos initially possessed certain legal equality, which provided them with many benefits, including inheritance. In the 18th century, however, Europeans fearful of slave revolts had restricted their rights, but they were successfully reclaimed in 1791.

See also
 Affranchi
 Gens de couleur
 Free people of color
 Afro-Haitians
 White Haitians
 Marabou
 Mulatto
 Passing (racial identity)
 Creole peoples

References and footnotes 

Ethnic groups in Haiti
 
Mulatto
Multiracial affairs in the Caribbean
People of Saint-Domingue
Person of color